Stade 7 Mars is a stadium in Ben Guerdane, Tunisia. It is currently used mostly for football.  The stadium holds 10,000 of which 4,000 are covered, and was built in 2000. It is used by the US Ben Guerdane.

The date of 7 March corresponds to the day of the Battle of Ben Guerdane which takes place on 7 March 2016 in Tunisia. The clashes between the Tunisian security forces and the jihadists of the Islamic state (IS).

References

Tunis
US Ben Guerdane